Christopher Layer (1531 – 19 June 1600), of Norwich, Norfolk, was an English merchant, burgess of Norwich, and briefly a Member of Parliament.

Biography

Layer was the son of William Layer, Mayor of Norwich and began his career as a grocer. He was one of the leading citizens of Norwich, serving as Sheriff for 1569–70, Alderman in 1570 and Mayor in 1581–82 and 1589–90. He imported goods from the Netherlands and invested in land and houses in Norwich, at Theberton, and elsewhere in Suffolk, and at Booton, Cawston, and Cringleford in Norfolk. His attempts to enclose the common at Great Witchingham in Norfolk led him into a long series of lawsuits.

He served briefly as one of the two Members of Parliament for Norwich in 1584–1585 and again in 1597–1598. During his second Parliament the two burgesses for Norwich were appointed to committees concerning navigation (12 Nov.), the bishop of Norwich (30 Nov.), land reclamation (3 Dec.), cloth (8 Dec.), and malt (12 Jan. 1598). During his Membership Norwich paid him expenses of five shillings a day while attending the relatively brief parliamentary sessions.

He was described by an opponent as a very politique and worldly minded man most regarding his own private commodity.  His will disposed of his lands among his grandchildren and surviving children, provided for a substantial income for his widow, the sole executrix, and contained bequests to numerous relatives and friends and to the poor in Norwich and elsewhere. Layer died 19 June 1600 and was buried at St. John's, Maddermarket, Norwich.

The four figurines encased in the two pilasters of The Layer Monument in the Church of St John Maddermarket are rare examples of Northern Mannerism sculpture in Britain.

He died in 1600.

Family

Christopher Layer was the son of William Layer, Mayor of Norwich and Elizabeth, daughter of John Marsham of Norwich, gentleman, and Elizabeth his wife, daughter of Hamond Claxton of Chedeston, Suffolk, gentleman.

In 1557, his uncle Thomas Marsham, Alderman of Norwich, was buried in St. John's Maddermarket. He left Elizabeth his wife, and Ralph his brother, each a moiety of the manor of Little Melton. James Marsham, his kinsman, was executor, with Elizabeth, his mother, Elizabeth, his wife, and Hamon Claxton, Gentleman. In his will the alderman mentions his sister, Elizabeth Layer, and his nephews, John, Thomas, and Christopher.

Through his aunt Mary Marsham Christopher Layer was a kinsman of Temperance Flowerdew and John Pory.

Christopher Layer married Barbara, the daughter of Augustine Steward. History of Parliament Online states that they had 4 sons and 5 daughters, but this could possibly be a misunderstanding of the Visitations, where it is stated that Christopher was the 4[th] son and Barbara the 5[th] daughter.

Children of Christopher Layer and Barbara Steward:

 Augustine Layer
 Elizabeth Layer
 Christopher Layer, who married Elizabeth, daughter of William Rugge (d.1616) of Felmingham in Norfolk, of the same Rugge family as the Bishop, and had:
 William
 Francis
 Christopher ob. s.p.
 Anne
 Elizabeth

References

1531 births
1600 deaths
Members of Parliament for Norwich
Mayors of Norwich
English MPs 1584–1585
English MPs 1597–1598
Businesspeople from Norwich